UE 900 and UE 900S are noise-isolating ear phones manufactured and marketed by Logitech, under the Ultimate Ears brand. They are aimed at listeners who prefer neutral sound signature. They are rated as one of the best ear phones in its price range by CNET.

The ear phones received overall highly positive reviews. However, they were described as offering method of fitting that might be uncomfortable to some listeners.

The ear phones include four armature drivers - two for bass, one for midrange and one for treble. They come with variety of accessories that often accompany more expensive custom models.

Design and accessories  
UE 900 looks like a pair of custom earphones and provides a good fit that seals off the ear canals. There are two cables that are being provided: one in blue color that houses microphone and three-button remote control for iPhones, and one in black color for audio only. It has four balanced armatures in each earpiece.
According to George Gill of Los Angeles Post-Examiner the UE900 utilizes a type of transducer that was originally designed for use in hearing aids and has been adapted for use in earphones."

Reception 
UE 900 received an "Excellent" rating from Tim Gideon of PC Magazine who noted: "The UE 900 sounds excellent overall, with a robust bass response and slightly boosted highs to match."

Steve Guttenberg from CNET commented that UE 900 is using separate bass, midrange and treble balanced armature drivers and is the best-sounding universal fit earphone in this price range.

Matthew Miller reviewed the UE 900 for ZDNet in an article named "You will swear you are listening to new music with the Logitech UE 900 earphones." In the summary of his review he wrote: "My favorite pair until now has been the UE Super.fi 5 Pro, but Logitech UE did it even better with the new UE 900s."

Meta review site Engadget wrote about the headset: "The UE 900s offer sound quality and a fit that comes close to what you'll get from UE's custom-fit in-ear models, with 9 sets of tips to fit just about any ears." However they noted that it is a relatively expensive product.

Michael Calore of Wired in an article "Ear Medicine" summarized his opinion about UE 900 as following: "The new flagship audiophile earphones from Ultimate Ears are just as awesome and perfect and beautiful-sounding as you’d expect from a $400 headset." He noted, that stunning audio quality may justify the high cost. However, he somewhat disliked the fit that he called "intrusive", commenting that it might not be for everyone.

BT Travel, a mainstream magazine for Business Traveling, noted that the noise isolation was very good during the test on a flight, however in his opinion it can also be a problem if someone would like to start a conversation with the listener.

IT News Africa's staff writer wrote that the sound "is delivered cleanly".

Mixmag, a British electronic dance and clubbing magazine, wrote about UE 900: "Logitech UE have released one of their most hi-def earphones ever."

PC Magazine wrote, that assigning armatures to different frequencies allows for more detail in each specific range, so that deep lows and crisp highs get their own driver. The lows are subtly lifted, "which allows instrumental and classical pieces, like John Adams' "The Chairman Dances," to retain a natural sound."

Wired was impressed by the audio quality and commented that UE 900s produce "some truly glorious sound, supremely rich from one end of the audio spectrum to the other. The bass is heavy and direct. Mid-range frequencies are perfectly represented, and the chiming highs are only slightly tempered at the very, very top end." The reviewer also noted an excellent clarity and ability to hear details he had never picked up on before.

ZDNET characterized the sound as clean, crisp, and authentic. The reviewer also noted that it seemed like he was in the recording studio with the bands and he has not heard sound this good before. While using UE900s with Beats Audio, that is introduced in a number of HTC smartphones, he noted a significant improvement in the music he was listening to.

Stereophile's writer Ariel Bitran related his opinion about the sound: "The earphones propelled the beat with confidence, discipline, punctuation, and control, accenting the chunkiness of the groove without being edgy." In his opinion the treble was chunky, resulting in a very non-fatiguing experience. Cymbals were somewhat grainy, while the midrange was ultra-clean. He could carefully discern instruments and follow them. Bass extended deep and he could hear normally inaudible or subdued whole-note bass synths in the chorus as warm and full-bodied for their entire duration. However, some highly compressed recordings such as the Red Hot Chili Peppers sounded "boxed".
He also noted: "Most importantly, the sound is realistic, controlled and involving. Instruments are rich with tone. Attacks are carefully restrained, but the high end is still involving with its texture. Music is presented cleanly in front of the listener."

Witchdoctor, a New Zealand's Web magazine, wrote: "The 900’s are able to walk the fine line between being very revealing and being too clinical."

See also 
Ultimate Ears

References 

Products introduced in 2014